Cartridge may refer to:

Objects
 Cartridge (firearms), a type of modern ammunition
 ROM cartridge, a removable component in an electronic device
 Cartridge (respirator), a type of filter used in respirators
 Ink cartridge, a component for inkjet printers that contains the ink.

Other uses
 Cartridge (surname), a surname
 Cartridge Creek, a creek near Fresno, California, United States

See also